Juan Carlos Lallana (24 December 1938 – 15 February 2022) was an Argentine footballer who played as a forward. He made five appearances for the Argentina national team from 1963 to 1965. He was also part of Argentina's squad for the 1963 South American Championship. Lallana ,s date of death 
Is  in 15 February 2022, at the age of 83.

References

External links
 

1938 births
2022 deaths
Argentine footballers
Footballers from Rosario, Santa Fe
Association football forwards
Argentina international footballers
Unión de Santa Fe footballers
San Lorenzo de Almagro footballers
Newell's Old Boys footballers
Club Atlético Lanús footballers
Argentinos Juniors footballers
Club Atlético River Plate footballers
Deportivo Cali footballers
Atlético Nacional footballers
Independiente Medellín footballers
Club Atlético Banfield footballers